McCarthy's Oregon Single Malt Whiskey is an American single malt whiskey produced by the Clear Creek Distillery.

Production
Noted for being one of the first American single malts introduced after Prohibition and aged for three years in the foothills of Mount Hood, Oregon, McCarthy's is made from 100% malted barley imported from Scotland. It is heavily peated, in the Islay tradition of single malt scotch, and draws comparisons to prominent whiskies such as Lagavulin. McCarthy's was a pioneer of the single malt American whisky revival in the early 1990s and has received equal praise and attention in the years following.  The 2008 release received a 96 rating (out of 100) in Jim Murray's Whisky Bible.

Current production is headed by veteran American craft distillers Joseph O'Sullivan and Caitlin Bartlemay.

References

External links
Clear Creek Distillery

Whiskies of the United States